Tafazzi is an Italian comic character created by Carlo Turati and portrayed by Giacomo Poretti, member of the group "Aldo, Giovanni e Giacomo". It originally appeared in Mai dire Gol, a comic-sports television show by the Gialappa's Band, but later appeared in other works of Aldo, Giovanni e Giacomo, including the theatre show I corti.

Tafazzi is a sort of mime wearing a black tracksuit and a jockstrap, who does nothing but beat his groin with a plastic bottle while wearing a jockstrap.

The character is the source of the name of the protein Tafazzin, due to the difficulties involved in identifying the tafazzin gene.

References 

Television characters
Mediaset